Darren L. Benson (born August 25, 1974) is a former American football defensive tackle in the National Football League for the Dallas Cowboys. He was selected by the Dallas Cowboys in the third round of the 1995 Supplemental Draft. He played college football at Trinity Valley Community College.

Early life and education
Benson attended Craigmont High School, where he played as a defensive tackle. He accepted a football scholarship from Arkansas State University. He didn't play in his first year because of failing to meet the grades requirements of Proposition 48. 

In 1993, he transferred to Trinity Valley Community College. As a freshman, he contributed to the team having an 11-1 record, while collecting 82 tackles and 10 sacks. 

As a sophomore, he played a key role in the undefeated (12-0) 1994 NJCA Championship team, posting 109 tackles (20 for loss) and 21 sacks.

Professional career
Benson was selected by the Dallas Cowboys in the third-round (1st overall) of the 1995 Supplemental Draft, surrendering by rule an equivalent pick in the 1996 NFL Draft. The Cowboys thought Benson had the athletic potential to develop into a Leon Lett type player. As a 21-year-old rookie, he was deactivated during the first half of the 1995 season, until injuries on the defensive line gave him a chance to have a reserve role throughout the second half of the season. Including pairing with Lett on the field goal rush team. He finished with 4 defensive tackles.

In 1996, he was having problems adjusting to the professional game and decided to quit the team during mini-camp. After he was convinced to return, he suffered torn anterior and medial collateral ligaments in his left knee during a practice and was placed on the injured reserve list on August 20.

In 1997, he was deactivated in the first 3 games of the season. He was deactivated for the fifth game against the New York Giants. He moved into the defensive tackle rotation after Chad Hennings suffered a groin injury. He was declared inactive in five straight games after Hennings returned from his injury. He played in the season finale against the Cincinnati Bengals and had 4 tackles. He recorded 7 tackles (one for loss) during the season.

In 1998, he suffered a torn right anterior cruciate ligament in the fourth preseason game against the St. Louis Rams. He was placed on the injured reserve list on August 24.

In 1999, he was released before the season started on September 6. He finished his career with 11 tackles (one for loss).

References

External links
Cowboy Coaches Keep Eye on Benson Darren Benson

1974 births
Living people
Players of American football from Memphis, Tennessee
American football defensive tackles
Trinity Valley Cardinals football players
Dallas Cowboys players